Vaher is an Estonian surname (meaning "maple"). Notable people with the surname include:

Ken-Marti Vaher (born 1974), Estonian politician
Lembi Vaher (born 1987), Estonian pole vaulter
Maret Vaher (born 1973), Estonian orienteer
Reelika Vaher (born 1978), Estonian footballer

Estonian-language surnames